FITS Aviation (Pvt) Limited, DBA FitsAir (formerly known as ExpoAir), is a Sri Lankan airline. It operates scheduled passenger services within Sri Lanka, as well as international cargo flights to several cities in the Middle East, Asia and Africa, and also operates charter flights to India. The company slogan is Friend In The Skies...

ExpoAir was the first airline in Sri Lanka to be certified under the International Civil Aviation Organization ( ICAO) annex requirements, as well as being the first domestic airline to be certified by the Department of Civil Aviation to commence flights to Jaffna.

History 

Expo Aviation was established in 1997, with operations commencing in 1998 using 2 Antonov An-8 aircraft, which were later replaced by An-12s.
 
In 2001, Expo Aviation started domestic operations to Jaffna using Ilyushin Il-18 and Antonov An-26 aircraft. Soon after this, the airline was renamed ExpoAir.

The next year, in 2002, the airline leased 3 Fokker F27 aircraft from Oman Air. An additional IL-18 started operating in 2003, and ExpoAir launched cabin crew training in 2004.

In 2005, Expo Air applied to the Civil Aviation Authority of Sri Lanka (CAASL) to operate international air cargo services to Malé, Mumbai, Tiruchirapalli, Thiruvananthapuram, Hyderabad, Vizag, Kochi, Bangalore, Chennai, Islamabad, Lahore, Karachi, Kathmandu, Chittagong, Dhaka, Bangkok, Kuala Lumpur, Singapore, Jakarta, Manila, Dubai, Abu Dhabi, Sharjah, Muscat, Jeddah, Beirut, and Cairo, as well as various cities in Australia, Africa, and Europe, with the short-haul routes utilizing the Airbus A320 and long-haul routes utilizing the Airbus A330 and Airbus A340 models. In 2006, ExpoAir added a Douglas DC-8 to its fleet and sold a Fokker 27.

Starting in January 2012, Expo Air relaunched its scheduled passenger flights from Ratmalana Airport to Jaffna Airport with a brand-new Cessna 208 Caravan. The aircraft has 12 seats and passengers are able to reach Jaffna in less than 1 hour.

In 2019, the airline expanded its domestic operations by introducing scheduled flights from Colombo to Batticaloa.

Scheduled Domestic operations to Jaffna recommenced in February 2020 with 3 flights weekly operated on their ATR 72-200.

In November 2020, the airline leased a former Thomas Cook Airbus A321 modified to carry cargo to operate nonstop flights to Dubai.

Destinations 

Expo flies to the following services to scheduled domestic and international destinations:

Fleet 

In June 2021, the FitsAir fleet includes the following aircraft:

Fleet history

Other Business 

ExpoAir has a leasing arm that wet- and dry-leases aircraft to third parties. In 2005, an F27 was dry-leased to Pakistan International Airlines, and in 2006, the airline wet-leased a Douglas DC-8-63CF to Air Mauritius. In 2007, it dry-leased another F27 aircraft to Mihin Lanka. In 2008, it wet-leased a Beech Super King Air 200 from South Africa and sub-leased the aircraft to the UN arm of WFP for operations in Sri Lanka.
In August 2014 Dimonim Air (Indonesia) leased the sole ATR 72-200, (PK-HVH), belonging to Sri Lankan carrier Fits Air, for use on its internal Indonesian network.

External links 
 FitsAir

References 

 

Airlines of Sri Lanka
Airlines established in 1997
Cargo airlines
Sri Lankan companies established in 1997